Acacia leptospermoides is a shrub belonging to the genus Acacia and the subgenus Phyllodineae and is endemic to a large area of south western Australia.

Description
Like most species of Acacia it has phyllodes rather than true leaves. The grey-green and fleshy phyllodes have a linear to obovate or orbicular shape and are planoconvex or horizontally flattened. It produces yellow flowers from June to September. The simple inflorescences are found singly or in pairs in the axils with showy spherical flowerheads with a diameter of  containing 20 to 35 golden coloured flowers. Following flowering thinly coriaceous-crustaceous and glabrous seed pods form.

Taxonomy
The species was first formally described by the botanist George Bentham in 1855 as part of the work Plantae Muellerianae: Mimoseae as published in the journal Linnaea: ein Journal für die Botanik in ihrem ganzen Umfange, oder Beiträge zur Pflanzenkunde. It was reclassified as Racosperma leptospermoides in 2003 by Leslie Pedley then transferred back to genus Acacia in 2006.

There are three subspecies
 Acacia leptospermoides subsp. leptospermoides
 Acacia leptospermoides subsp. obovata
 Acacia leptospermoides subsp. psammophila

Distribution
It is native to an area in the Great Southern, Wheatbelt and Mid West regions of Western Australia where it is commonly situated on sand ridges and sand plains growing in gravelly sandy, loamy or clay soils often around laterite. The species is found from around Shark Bay in the north west to around Cranbrook and Wagin in the south east.

See also
List of Acacia species

References

leptospermoides
Acacias of Western Australia
Taxa named by George Bentham
Plants described in 1855